The Saratoga County Homestead, or Homestead Sanitarium, was a large tuberculosis sanatorium located in the hamlet of Barkersville, [Also known as East Galway] in Providence, New York. It is publicly recorded as The Homestead Sanitarium and located on County Highway 16.

The Homestead was opened in 1914 and treated patients for tuberculosis until 1960. The original building was wood, but was replaced by the brick building that stands today, in 1932. The institution reopened in 1961 as The Saratoga County Infirmary.

Some visitors of the building point to the things left behind — beds, books, kitchen supplies, medical supplies, etc. — as evidence of the facility being shut down suddenly. However, if this was in fact reopened as the Saratoga County Infirmary, then the left behind items would not be related to the Sanitarium.

Saratoga County officials sold the building in the 1980s to Bruce Houran, who was planning to reopen it as healthcare related facility. The building remains vacant, but still stands.

Thrill seekers have often traveled to this building in the hopes of capturing some ghostly activity.

It appears this has been sold to Patrick Brereton of Saratoga Springs, NY.

The Homestead was sold via tax auction in Sept 2019 to current owner, James Walk from Corinth TX. The Homestead is set to undergo renovations and James is working with a local contact to start scheduling photography tours and will eventually open access to most parts of the hospital.  The caretakers house is scheduled as the first stage in the rehab for the entire property. Plans for the property include creating a retreat for veterans, adding some local business, creation of agricultural training course and outdoor gardens along with a living museum of the sites history as a TB Hospital.  Ticket sales from tours and investigations are being used to rehab the facility and all excess is being donated to a nonprofit for veterans and first responders VFR Community Outreach Corp www.VFRcommunity.com  Current status on the Saratoga Homestead can be found on the Facebook page @saratogahomestead where the owner is a frequent poster.

References

Hospital buildings completed in 1932
Tuberculosis sanatoria in the United States
Defunct hospitals in New York (state)
Buildings and structures in Saratoga County, New York
1914 establishments in New York (state)
1979 disestablishments in New York (state)